SS Penelope Barker (MC contract 868) was a Liberty ship built in the United States during World War II. She was named after Penelope Barker, American Revolution activist and organizer of the Edenton Tea Party boycott in 1774.

The ship was laid down by North Carolina Shipbuilding Company in their Cape Fear River yard on October 28, 1942, then launched on December 1, 1942.  Penelope Baker was operated by the North Atlantic & Gulf Steamship Company for the War Shipping Administration when she was struck by two torpedoes and sunk in the Barents Sea.  Five men were killed and five men missing, the rest making it safely to a Russian port.

References 

Liberty ships
Ships built in Wilmington, North Carolina
1942 ships